Plymouth High School may refer to:

United Kingdom
Plymouth High School for Girls in Plymouth, Devon, England

United States
Plymouth High School (Indiana) in Plymouth, Indiana
Plymouth High School (Michigan), part of Plymouth-Canton Educational Park
Plymouth High School (North Carolina) in Plymouth, North Carolina
Plymouth High School (Ohio) in Plymouth, Ohio
Plymouth High School (Oregon), see St. Helens School District
Plymouth High School (Wisconsin) in Plymouth, Wisconsin
 Plymouth North High School in Plymouth, Massachusetts, formerly Plymouth-Carver High School, and prior to that, Plymouth High School
 Plymouth Regional High School in Plymouth, New Hampshire
 Plymouth South High School in Plymouth, Massachusetts

See also
 Plymouth-Whitemarsh High School in Plymouth Meeting, Pennsylvania, United States
 New Plymouth High School in New Plymouth, Idaho, United States
 New Plymouth Boys' High School in New Plymouth, New Zealand
 New Plymouth Girls' High School in New Plymouth, New Zealand